The streaked xenops (Xenops rutilans) is a passerine bird in the ovenbird family Furnariidae. It breeds in the tropical New World from Costa Rica and Trinidad south to Bolivia and northern Argentina.

The head is dark brown with a whitish supercilium and malar stripe. The upper parts are brown, becoming rufous on the tail and rump, and there is a buff bar on the darker brown wings. The underparts are white-streaked olive brown. Males and females look alike. Visually inconspicuous, it is easier located by its chattering call, a series of 5 or 6 metallic zeet notes.

It is found in wet forests in foothills and mountains between  ASL, and will utilize secondary forests and opened-up growth. The streaked xenops is often difficult to see as it forages on bark, rotting stumps or bare twigs; it moves in all directions on the trunk like a treecreeper, but does not use its tail as a prop. It feeds on arthropods such as the larvae of wood-boring beetles, but can also catch flying termites in mid-air. It joins mixed-species feeding flocks on a more or less regular basis depending on location, usually moving through the middle levels of the forest.

The normal clutch is two white eggs, incubated by both sexes.

Eleven subspecies are recognised.
 X. r. septentrionalis Zimmer, JT, 1929 – Costa Rica and west Panama
 X. r. incomptus Wetmore, 1970 – east Panama
 X. r. heterurus Cabanis & Heine, 1860 – Colombia, north Venezuela, northeast Ecuador and Trinidad
 X. r. perijanus Phelps, WH & Phelps, WH Jr, 1954 – Serranía del Perijá (northeast Colombia and northwest Venezuela)
 X. r. phelpsi Meyer de Schauensee, 1959 – Sierra Nevada de Santa Marta (northeast Colombia)
 X. r. guayae Hellmayr, 1920 – west Ecuador and northwest Peru
 X. r. peruvianus Zimmer, JT, 1935 – east Ecuador to south Peru
 X. r. connectens Chapman, 1919 – west Bolivia to northwest Argentina
 X. r. purusianus Todd, 1925 – south Amazonian Brazil
 X. r. chapadensis Zimmer, JT, 1935 – east Bolivia and southwest Brazil
 X. r. rutilans Temminck, 1821 – southeast Brazil, east Paraguay and northeast Argentina

References

Sources
 de L. Fávaro, Fernando; dos Anjos, Luiz; Lopes, Edson V.; Mendonça, Luciana B. & Volpato, Graziele H. (2006): Efeito do gradiente altitudinal/latitudinal sobre espécies de aves florestais da família Furnariidae na Bacia do Rio Tibagi, Paraná, Brasil [Effect of altitudinal/latitudinal gradient about forest ovenbirds species (Aves: Furnariidae) in the Tibagi river basin, Paraná, Brazil]. Revista Brasileira de Zoologia 23(1): 261–266 [Portuguese with English abstract].  PDF fulltext
 Hilty, Steven L. (2003): Birds of Venezuela. Christopher Helm, London. 
 Machado, C.G. (1999): A composição dos bandos mistos de aves na Mata Atlântica da Serra de Paranapiacaba, no sudeste brasileiro [Mixed flocks of birds in Atlantic Rain Forest in Serra de Paranapiacaba, southeastern Brazil]. Revista Brasileira de Biologia 59(1): 75-85 [Portuguese with English abstract].  PDF fulltext
 Olson, Storrs L. & Alvarenga, Herculano M. F. (2006): An extraordinary feeding assemblage of birds at a termite swarm in the Serra da Mantiqueira, São Paulo, Brazil. Revista Brasileira de Ornitologia 14(3): 297-299 [English with Portuguese abstract]. PDF fulltext

External links
 Streaked xenops videos, photos & sounds on the Internet Bird Collection

streaked xenops
Birds of Costa Rica
Birds of the Northern Andes
Birds of Brazil
Birds of Bolivia
Birds of Ecuador
streaked xenops
Taxobox binomials not recognized by IUCN